Shokrabad (also Romanized as Shokrābād; also known as Lashkarābād) is a village in Khalazir Rural District, Aftab District, Tehran County, Tehran Province, Iran. At the 2006 census, its population was 305, in 73 families.

References 

Populated places in Tehran County